Racing to the Rainbow is the 25th album release by Australian children's music group, the Wiggles. This album won the ARIA Award for Best Children's Album in 2006.

Track list

And on the DVD but not the CD:
 "Runaway (A Storm is on Its Way)"
 "Baa, Baa, Black Sheep"

Video

Racing to the Rainbow was released on ABC DVD in 2006.

Songs
 "Here Come the Chicken"
 "Shakin' Like a Leafy Tree"
 "Run, Run, Run Away (A Storm is on Its Way)"
 "Teddy Bears' Big Day Out"
 "Rainbow of Colours"
 "Blow Up Your Balloon (Huff and Huff and Puff)"
 "The Chew Chew Song"
 "The Princess of the Sea"
 "Benny Put the Kettle On"
 "Baa, Baa, Black Sheep"
 "Stamp Your Feet (To the Heavy Beat)"
 "He's a Bird! What a Bird!"
 "Do the Daddy Long Legs"
 "The Tra-La-La Song"
 "Huddle, Huddle, Huddle Along (The Football Song)"
 "The Wheels on the Bus"
 "Go to Sleep Jeff (Brahms' Lullaby)"
 "Row, Row, Row Your Boat"
 "Rockin' on the Water"
 "Five Little Ducks"
 "Everybody Dance!"

Cast
The cast as listed on the video closing credits.
 The Wiggles
 Greg Page
 Anthony Field
 Murray Cook
 Jeff Fatt

 Also featuring
 Captain Feathersword: Paul Paddick
 Dorothy the Dinosaur: Lyn Moran and Clare Field
 Voiceover: Zoe Velez
 Henry the Octopus: Katherine Patrick
 Voiceover: Jeff Fatt 
 Wags the Dog: Kristy Talbot
 Voiceover: Mic Conway
 Magdalena the Mermaid: Larissa Wright 
 King of the Road: Kamahl
 Smoky Dawson
 Queen of the Rainbow: Georgie Parker

Tour
From 30 November 2006 – 18 November 2007 the Wiggles embarked on the Racing to the Rainbow Show tour in the USA, Europe and Australia. This tour introduced new yellow wiggle Sam Moran. Two of the shows in Australia were filmed for their DVD Wiggledancing Live in Concert.

References

External links

The Wiggles videos
The Wiggles albums
2006 albums
ARIA Award-winning albums
2006 video albums
Australian children's musical films